is the fourth studio album from the J-pop idol group Morning Musume and was released on March 27, 2002.

Overview
It is currently their second highest selling album, with a total of 515,400 copies sold. Since their last album (with new material) 3rd: Love Paradise, two more generations of members had joined, which might have contributed to the album's overall success. The album contained such popular singles as "The Peace!" and "Ren'ai Revolution 21." The first pressing edition of the album came in special packaging, with a B3-sized folded poster.

Track listing

Members at the time of Album 
1st generation: Kaori Iida, Natsumi Abe
2nd generation: Kei Yasuda, Mari Yaguchi
3rd generation: Maki Goto
4th generation: Rika Ishikawa, Hitomi Yoshizawa, Nozomi Tsuji, Ai Kago
5th generation: Ai Takahashi, Asami Konno, Makoto Ogawa, Risa Niigaki

External links 
 4th Ikimasshoi! entry on the Up-Front Works official website

Morning Musume albums
Zetima albums
2002 albums